Aframomum chrysanthum is a monocotyledonous plant species the family Zingiberaceae first described by John Michael Lock.

References 

chrysanthum